Now That's What I Call Music (also simply titled Now or Now 1) is the first album from the popular Now! series that was released in the United Kingdom on 28 November 1983. Initial pressings were released on vinyl and audio cassette. To celebrate the 25th anniversary of the album and series, the album was re-released on CD for the first time in 2009. Alternative longer mixes of "Only for Love", "Double Dutch" and "Candy Girl" were included in place of the original shorter single mixes from 1983. A double vinyl re-release followed for Record Store Day on 18 April 2015. In July 2018, the album was newly remastered and re-released on CD, vinyl and cassette to commemorate the release of the 100th volume of the series.

In December 1983, the compilation debuted at number seven on the UK Albums Chart and reached number one a week later, staying at the top for five non-consecutive weeks.

Track listing

Now That's What I Call Music video
A video selection was also released featuring selected tracks from the main album, one track that later featured on Volume II of the series and two which did not appear on any Now album.

 Phil Collins : "You Can't Hurry Love"
 Duran Duran : "Is There Something I Should Know"
 UB40 : "Red Red Wine"
 Limahl : "Only for Love"
 Heaven 17 : "Temptation"
 Malcolm McLaren : "Double Dutch"
 Culture Club : "Karma Chameleon"
 Men Without Hats : "The Safety Dance"
 Kajagoogoo : "Too Shy"
 Mike Oldfield : "Moonlight Shadow"
 Rock Steady Crew : "(Hey You) The Rock Steady Crew"
 Tina Turner : "Let's Stay Together"
 Freeez : "I.O.U." †
 Howard Jones : "New Song"
 UB40 : "Please Don't Make Me Cry"
 Will Powers : "Kissing with Confidence"
 Genesis : "That's All"
 Kajagoogoo : "Big Apple"
 The Assembly : "Never Never" †
 Thompson Twins : "Hold Me Now" ††
 Peabo Bryson & Roberta Flack : "Tonight I Celebrate My Love"

† Never appeared on any of the numbered NOW albums but did appear on Now 1983 in the 10th Anniversary Series.

†† Later appeared on NOW 2.

Charts

References

External links
 
 Now That's What I Call Music television commercial

1983 compilation albums
 001
EMI Records compilation albums
Sony Music compilation albums
Virgin Records compilation albums